Thanthanadu is a village in Kotagiri Taluk of The Nilgiris District, Tamil Nadu, India.  The population is largely Badaga. It is located 2 km from Kotagiri.
This village comprises both the Christians and the Hindus community. Tea is the major crop in this village. Thanthanadu is also known for its pear fruits.

Villages in Nilgiris district